Pesaresi is an Italian surname. Notable people with the surname include:

 Emanuele Pesaresi (born 1976), Italian footballer
  (born 1991), Italian volleyball player

Italian-language surnames